Preston Harvey Callison Sr. (January 22, 1923 – November 25, 2022) was an American attorney and politician who represented his native Lexington County, South Carolina, as a Democrat in the South Carolina House of Representatives. His tenure extended for two nonconsecutive terms from 1965 to 1966 and 1969 to 1970.

Life and career
Callison was born in Lexington, South Carolina on January 22, 1923, as the son of Tolliver Cleveland Callison and Margaret Reel Callison. He graduated from Lexington High School, before attending the University of South Carolina. It was there he met Helen Elizabeth Leppard; they married on July 9, 1949 and had three children. He served in the Army Air Force during World War II, before returning to the University of South Carolina Law School, earning a degree by 1947.

Callison died in Eugene, Oregon on November 25, 2022, at the age of 99.

References

1923 births
2022 deaths
20th-century American politicians
Democratic Party members of the South Carolina House of Representatives
People from Lexington, South Carolina